Lukovë is a village and a former municipality in the Vlorë County, southern Albania. At the 2015 local government reform, it became a subdivision of the municipality Himarë. The population at the 2011 census was 2,916.

Name
The Albanian toponym Lukovë stems from Slavic, either from the words Luk, Laka, Luka meaning water flowing nearby, meadowland, river meadow, wet meadow along a river or from luk, luka, place of onions; alongside the suffix ov/a. It is known in Greek as "Λούκοβο".

History
During the Ottoman period, Lukovë, together with nearby Piqeras and Nivicë, was apart of the Himara area and enjoyed special semi-autonomous status inside this community. Between 1570 and 1571, a short-lived rebellion broke out under Emmanuel Mormoris in the Himara region. After a prolonged siege, the rebels managed to capture the castle of  Nivicë.

In 1798, Lukovë, together with adjacent villages in the region south of Himara, were attacked and plundered by the local Ottoman lord Ali Pasha of Ioannina. In the villages of Nivice and Shën Vasil, massacres of Orthodox inhabitants were committed in Easter of 1798. As such, cases of massive islamization among the local population were followed in the region.

During the end of the 19th century, Greek elementary schools were already operating in the villages of Lukovë, Nivicë, Çorraj and Shën Vasil.

Demographics 
According to German academic research conducted in 1957, the villages of Piqeras, Lukovë and Sasaj were among the Greek-speaking pockets on the Albanian Ionian coast.

The municipal unit consists of the following settlements: According to 1991 estimates, Lukovë, the municipal seat is inhabited by a majority Orthodox Albanian population (2076 or 82%), alongside minorities of Muslim Albanians (250 or 12%) and Greeks (150 or 6%). Borsh, Fterrë and Sasaj are exclusively populated by Muslim Albanians. Piqeras is inhabited by an Orthodox Albanian majority (991) with a minority of 100 Muslim Albanians and 50 Greeks. Çorraj is a mixed village inhabited by an Orthodox Albanian population and Albanian Muslims. Nivicë is inhabited by an Orthodox Albanian majority (899) and a minority of Greeks (30). Qazim Pali is a new village established during the communist period and is populated by Muslim Albanians (861) alongside minorities of Orthodox Albanians (50) and Greeks (80). In a demographic investigation by Leonidas Kallivretakis in the late 20th century, the population of Lukovë commune and all its villages, 54% were Albanian Christians, 40% were Albanian Muslims and 6% were Greek Christians.

Seaside settlements of the Lukovë area were among Greek minority areas that underwent a substantial decrease in population after the fall of communism in Albania in the early 1990s.

Climate

Lukovë has a hot-summer mediterranean climate (Köppen Csa). Precipitation mainly falls within the winter months. Lukovë has mild winters and hot, dry summers. The average annual temperature is 15.1 °C or 59.2 °F. Precipitation amounts to 737 mm or 29.0 inches annually.

Notable people
Nafiz Bezhani, Albanian jurist, politician and writer.
Dimitrios Doulis (1865–1928), Greek politician, minister of military affairs of the Autonomous Republic of Northern Epirus, from Nivice.
Muzafer Korkuti, Albanian archaeologist and Vice President of the Academy of Sciences of Albania
Vasil Laçi (1922–1941), Albanian patriot who attempted to kill in 1941 Victor Emmanuel III, then King of Italy and Shefqet Bej Vërlaci, then Prime Minister of Albania
Jakup Mato, Albanian publicist and educational administrator, head of Centre of Art Studies of the Academy of Sciences of Albania.
Niphon of Kafsokalyvia (1316–1411), Greek monk and saint of the Eastern Orthodox Church

See also
 List of cities and towns in Albania

References

External links

 Kakome Beaches

Former municipalities in Vlorë County
Administrative units of Himara
Villages in Vlorë County
Labëria